Dana L. Layton is an American politician and a former Republican member of the Utah House of Representatives. She represented District 60 from January 1, 2013 to December 31, 2014.

Early life and career
Layton earned her BA in design from Brigham Young University and her MBA from its Marriott School of Management. Layton is a self-employed Production Executive and CEO of Layton Productions and Best of State Promotions. Layton lives in Orem, Utah with her husband and five children.

Political career
2012 Layton was selected by the Republican convention from two candidates to challenge District 60 incumbent Republican Representative Bradley Daw in the June 26, 2012 Republican Primary, which she won with 2,285 votes (52.4%) and won the November 6, 2012 General election with 10,801 votes (83.9%) against Democratic nominee Emmanuel Kepas.
During the 2013 and 2014 legislative sessions, Representative Layton served on the Higher Education Appropriations Subcommittee, the House Business and Labor Committee, and the
House Law Enforcement and Criminal Justice Committee. During the interim, Layton served on the Business and Labor Interim Committee as well as the Law Enforcement and Criminal Justice Interim Committee.
In the 2014 primary election she lost a primary challenge to former representative Brad Daw. The vote was 1347 to 1584

2014 Sponsored Legislation

Representative Layton did not floor sponsor any bills in the 2014 General Legislative Session.

References

External links
Official page at the Utah State Legislature
Campaign site

Dana Layton at Ballotpedia
Dana Layton at OpenSecrets

Place of birth missing (living people)
Year of birth missing (living people)
Living people
Brigham Young University alumni
Marriott School of Management alumni
Republican Party members of the Utah House of Representatives
Politicians from Orem, Utah
Women state legislators in Utah
21st-century American women politicians
21st-century American politicians